Scoparia phalerias is a species of moth in the family Crambidae. It is endemic to New Zealand.

Taxonomy
This species was described by Edward Meyrick in 1905. However the placement of this species within the genus Scoparia is in doubt. As a result, this species has also been referred to as Scoparia (s.l.) phalerias.

References

Moths described in 1905
Moths of New Zealand
Scorparia
Endemic fauna of New Zealand
Taxa named by Edward Meyrick
Endemic moths of New Zealand